Thomas O'Fihelly, a Franciscan friar from County Cork, Ireland, was Bishop of Leighlin from 1555 to 1567.

References

16th-century Anglican bishops in Ireland
Bishops of Leighlin
Friars Minor
People from County Cork